General of the Army Ivan Aleksandrovych Gerasymov  (Ukrainian: Іва́н Олекса́ндрович Гера́симов, Russian: Иван Александрович Герасимов; August 8, 1921 – June 4, 2008) was a Soviet general, Ukrainian politician and deputy in the Ukrainian parliament (Verkhovna Rada). He was a member of the Communist Party of Ukraine.
Herasymov was the oldest sitting member of the Verkhovna Rada at the time of his death on June 4, 2008 at the age of 87.

Biography
An ethnic Russian, Ivan Aleksandrovich Gerasimov was born on 8 August 1921. In 1940, he joined the Red Army. From 1940 to 1941 he was a commander of a platoon in the Odessa Military District. From 1941 to 1942 he was the commander of a tank company on the South and South-Western Front. Throughout the rest of the war, he was the commander of a tank battalion on the North Caucasian Front, commander of a Tank Regiment of Voronezh, 1st Ukrainian Front and Chief of Staff of a Tank Brigade of the 2nd Far East Front.

Postwar
After the war, he attended the Military Academy of Armored and Mechanized Forces in Moscow. He graduated from it in 1955. From 1955 to 1964 he held numerous posts within the framework of divisions. In 1964–1966 he attended the Military Academy of the General Staff of the Armed Forces of the USSR. From 1966 to 1971 he was the commander of the 1st Tank Army. From 1971 to 1972 he was the First Deputy Commander of the Carpathian Military District. From 1972 to 1975 he was the Commander of the Northern Army Group, and then from 1975 to 1984 he was the Commander of the Kyiv Military District. He was made from 1984 to 1990 the Commander in chief of the troops of the South-Western Direction, and in 1986 arrived at the site of the Chernobyl disaster to head Soviet Ministry of Defence efforts there, in succession to General Vladimir Pikalov.

Fall of the USSR
From 1990 until his retirement from the army in 1992 he was the Chief Inspector of the Main Inspectorate of the Ministry of Defense. From 2002 to 2008, he was a people's Deputy of Ukraine. On 3 July 2004, he led the Ukrainian delegation of veterans at the Minsk Independence Day Parade in honor of the Minsk Offensive's diamond jubilee. On 27 October, he inspected the military parade on Maidan Nezalezhnosti in honor of the 60th anniversary of the Liberation of Ukraine along with Oleksandr Kuzmuk. He was a member of the Communist Party of Ukraine. He died on 4 June 2008 in Kyiv and is buried in Moscow. On 9 May 2010, in honor of the 65th anniversary of the end of the World War II, a memorial plaque was installed in his honor at the building of the Ministry of Defense in Kyiv.

References

External links

1921 births
2008 deaths
People from Bashkortostan
Army generals (Soviet Union)
Russian emigrants to Ukraine
Politburo of the Central Committee of the Communist Party of Ukraine (Soviet Union) members
Fourth convocation members of the Verkhovna Rada
Fifth convocation members of the Verkhovna Rada
Sixth convocation members of the Verkhovna Rada
Communist Party of Ukraine politicians
Recipients of the title of Hero of Ukraine
Chernobyl liquidators
Military Academy of the General Staff of the Armed Forces of the Soviet Union alumni
Warsaw Pact invasion of Czechoslovakia
Recipients of the Order of Bohdan Khmelnytsky, 1st class
Recipients of the Order of Bohdan Khmelnytsky, 2nd class
Recipients of the Order of Bohdan Khmelnytsky, 3rd class
Recipients of the Order of Gold Star (Ukraine)
Soviet military personnel of World War II